The Attarine Mosque also known as the Mosque of St. Athanasius was a Catholic Church-turned mosque that is situated in the Attarine District in Alexandria, Egypt. The former church was built in 370 AD and is dedicated to St. Athanasius of Alexandria. When Islam came to Egypt, the church was converted to a small mosque.

Roman rule 
In 370 AD, The Church of St. Athanasius was built.

Islamic conquest 

On November 8, 641 AD, Alexandria fell into Muslim control by the caliph, Umar after a 14-month siege under the leadership of Amr ibn al-As when the Byzantine Empire surrendered the city and a treaty was signed. Since then, the church was turned into a mosque by the Muslims.

Napoleonic expedition 

In 1798, Napoleon Bonaparte led the French campaign in Egypt and Syria. The Attarine Mosque was once thought by the French to house the Tomb of Alexander the Great. Vivant Denon's drawing of the mosque courtyard depicted a small octagonal building housing a sarcophagus closely resembling the "House of Alexander the Great" which leads to speculations whether this was the tomb of the city's founder. It was later known that the sarcophagus belongs to Nectanebo II.

See also
  Lists of mosques 
  List of mosques in Africa
  List of mosques in Egypt

References 

370
370s establishments in the Roman Empire
Alexandria, Saint Athanasius
4th-century establishments in Egypt
Alexander the Great
Alexandria, Saint Athanasius
Alexandria, Saint Athanasius
French campaign in Egypt and Syria
Mosques converted from churches
Mosques in Alexandria